Jennifer Bartlett ( Losch; March 14, 1941 – July 25, 2022) was an American artist. She was known for paintings and prints that combine the system-based aesthetic of conceptual art with the painterly approach of Neo-Expressionism. Many of her pieces were executed on small, square, enamel-coated steel plates that are combined in grid formations to create very large works.

Early life and education
Bartlett was born Jennifer Losch in 1941 in Long Beach, California, one of four children. Her father owned a construction company, and her mother was a fashion illustrator who left the field to raise her children. She grew up in the suburbs of Long Beach, close enough to the ocean that she developed an affinity for water, which would reappear in her mature work. She attended Mills College in Oakland, California, graduating with a BA in 1963. During her college years, she met Elizabeth Murray, who became a lifelong friend. She then moved to New Haven to study at the Yale School of Art and Architecture at a time when minimalism was the dominant style. She studied with Josef Albers, Jack Tworkov, Jim Dine, and Richard Serra, receiving her MFA in 1965.

Bartlett described the experience of study at Yale as her broadest influence: "I'd walked into my life". In a 2005 interview with the sculptor Elizabeth Murray, she gave this list of things that she said had been on her mind as a first-year art student:

Being an artist, Ed Bartlett, Bach cello suites, Cézanne, getting into graduate school, getting to New York, Albert Camus, James Joyce. I’d drawn constantly since childhood: large drawings of every creature alive in the ocean; Spanish missions with Indians camping in the foreground, in the background Spanish men throwing cowhides over a cliff to a waiting ship; hundreds of Cinderellas on five-by-eight pads, all alike but with varying hair color and dresses.

Among Bartlett's early influences were Arshile Gorky, Piet Mondrian, and Sol LeWitt.

Work

Bartlett was best known for her paintings and prints in which familiar subjects — ranging from houses and gardens to oceans and skies — are executed in a style that combines elements of both representational and abstract art; indeed, she commented that she did not accept a distinction between figurative and abstract art. She often worked in serial form or created polyptychs, and she frequently devised rule systems that guide the variations within a given group of works, requiring viewers to focus on "perception, on process, on the effect of shifting perspective— and on the leaps that take place in our minds no matter how rational we may think we are". In the late 1960s, influenced by the work of John Cage, she started bringing chance elements into her work.

Her realistic works favored mundane subjects, such as modest houses. Her installations often consisted of multiple canvases as well as three dimensional objects. House with Open Door from 1988, in the collection of the Honolulu Museum of Art, consists of an oil paint on canvas diptych and the same house constructed out of wood. The Dallas Museum of Art, the Honolulu Museum of Art, the Los Angeles County Museum of Art, the Metropolitan Museum of Art, the Museum of Fine Arts, Houston, the Museum of Modern Art (New York City), the Philadelphia Museum of Art, the San Francisco Museum of Modern Art, the Tate Modern, and the Whitney Museum of American Art (New York City) are among the public collections holding her work.

Most critics perceived Bartlett's work as inventive, energetic, wide-ranging, and ambitious, and she was considered one of the two best painters of the postminimalism generation. One writer noted that a central paradox of her work was that Bartlett took the controlled, rationalist grid often favored by conceptual artists and used it to release an evocative torrent of imagery that was much in common with the Neo-Expressionist work of the 1980s. A few critics found her work shallow, overly focused on surface, and weakened by its eclecticism. She had several retrospectives and survey exhibitions, the first in 1985 originating at the Brooklyn Museum (New York) and with more recent ones in 2011 at the Museum of Modern Art (New York) and 2014 at the Parrish Art Museum (New York).

Early experimental work
Early on, Bartlett made a number of three-dimensional works that she subjected to extreme conditions such as freezing and smashing. She also realized that she wanted something to draw on that was erasable but gridded like the graph paper that she and many other conceptual artists were using at the time. She came up with what is now one of her signature materials: foot-square steel plates with a plain white baked enamel surface on which was silkscreened a quarter-inch grid. She had these fabricated in large quantities, and later worked with other sizes as well.

Rhapsody (1975–76)
With her earliest well-known work, Rhapsody, Bartlett reinvented the mural form for Conceptual art. Rhapsody is a painting executed on 987 foot-square enamel-coated steel tiles arranged in a grid 7 plates tall by roughly 142 wide, extending across multiple walls. The subject matter consists of variations on what Bartlett felt were the basic elements of art: four universal motifs (house, tree, ocean, mountain), geometric forms (line, circle, triangle, square), and color (25 shades). The seven sections are entitled "Introduction", "Mountain", "Line", "House", "Tree", "Shape", and "Ocean".

Rhapsody has been called an "extended portable mural" and a "post-painting painting" that "took the American art world by storm". According to critic Roberta Smith, Rhapsody is an epic achievement that brought together elements of photorealism, geometric abstraction, and pattern painting while also prefiguring 1980s Neo-Expressionism. It is so large that Bartlett commented that she never saw the piece as a whole until its first public exhibition. Bartlett said of Rhapsody that it "opened the wall up instead of closing it down. It looks bigger than it really is.... It’s my way of making edgeless paintings." It has been acquired by the Museum of Modern Art (New York).

Subsequent series such as In the Garden and Amagansett have become more painterly while still retaining their systematizing rigor. Around 2004, she began including fragments of text — phrases, bits of dialogue, dreams — in some of her paintings.

At Sea, Japan (1980)
In 1980, Bartlett began to work on a complex print project in collaboration with master printers in Japan. The result was At Sea, Japan, a waterscape printed on paper whose 6 panels span 8 feet in width. The image is built up from 96 screenprints and 86 color woodcuts.

In the Garden series (1979–83)
In the Garden is a series of over 200 drawings (and later paintings and prints) that all take as their subject the garden behind a villa in Nice, France, where Bartlett stayed in the winter of 1979–1980. Bartlett used a few major motifs — an old swimming pool, a statue of a urinating boy, a row of cypresses — to explore perspective, scale, and changing light conditions. The drawings range from pencil sketches to pastels and gouaches executed in a range of styles, and many are diptychs or triptychs. She later made her backyard garden in Brooklyn, New York, the focus of a similar series of diptychs.

Sea Wall (1985)
With Sea Wall, Bartlett brought together oil painting and sculpture. The piece consists of a large painting of houses and boats on a dark ground, in front of which are placed sculptural versions of those same objects.

Digital Painting (1987)
In 1987, the BBC invited Bartlett as one of six international artists, including David Hockney and Sidney Nolan, to work on a Quantel digital Paintbox. The series was called Painting With Light and, though she was at first reluctant, she grew to enjoy her first attempt at digital painting and discussed the implications of this new medium as she worked.

Air: 24 Hours (1991-92)
A collaboration between Bartlett and the fiction writer Deborah Eisenberg, Air: 24 Hours first appeared as a book of 24 paintings by Bartlett with accompanying text by Eisenberg. Each paintings shows a scene in Bartlett's house at a particular hour of the day.

Amagansett series (2007–08)
Amagansett is a series of oil paintings that take the ocean, skies, and seaside landscapes of Long Island as their subject. They are painted in a distinctive cross-hatched style in a limited palette favoring blues, greens, grays, and browns. Some pieces are diptychs in which Bartlett explores the shifts visible in a landscape between two moments of time or seen from two slightly different angles of view.

Commissions
In 1981, Bartlett created Swimmers Atlanta, a 200-foot multimedia mural for the Federal Building in Atlanta, Georgia. Thereafter she completed commissions for Volvo, AT&T, Saatchi & Saatchi, Information Sciences Institute, and Battery Park.

Personal life and death
After marrying medical student Ed Bartlett in 1964, she commuted between the Soho district of New York City and New Haven, where she taught at the University of Connecticut. 

Following her 1972 divorce, Bartlett moved to New York City full-time and began teaching at the School of Visual Arts. In 1983, she married German actor Mathieu Carrière, with whom she had a daughter, Alice; they divorced in the early 1990s. She lived in New York City and Paris, France. As of 2014, she resided full-time in Amagansett on Long Island.

Bartlett died from acute myeloid leukemia at her home in Amagansett on July 25, 2022, aged 81.

Selected exhibitions
 Paula Cooper Gallery, New York, 1976. Rhapsody.
 Whitney Museum of American Art, New York, 1978. New Image Painting. 
 Clocktower Gallery, New York, 1979.
 Whitney Biennial, 1981. 
 Walker Art Center, Minneapolis, MN, 1984. 
 Brooklyn Museum, New York, 1985. 15 Year Retrospective. Touring retrospective.
 Walker Art Center, 1986. Touring exhibition.
 Orlando Museum of Art, 1993. Touring retrospective of prints. 
 Locks Gallery, Philadelphia, 1994. Recent Works from the AIR: 24 Hours Series.
 Locks Gallery, Philadelphia, 2000. Islands and Oceans.
 Locks Gallery, Philadelphia, 2004. At Sea.
 Addison Gallery of American Art, 2006. Early Plate Work.
 Pace Gallery, New York, 2011. Recitative (2009–10).
 Locks Gallery, Philadelphia, 2011. The Studio Inside Out.
 Museum of Modern Art, New York, 2011. Rhapsody and other works.
 Locks Gallery, Philadelphia, 2012, Addresses (1976–1978)"
 Locks Gallery, Philadelphia, 2013, Chaos Theory
 Parrish Art Museum, 2014. Jennifer Bartlett: History of the Universe — Works 1970–2011. Touring survey.
 Locks Gallery, Philadelphia, 2015. In the Garden
 Paula Cooper Gallery, 2016.

Honors and collections
Bartlett was a recipient of the 2019 Francis J. Greenburger Award. Bartlett received the American Academy and Institute of Arts and Letters Award in 1983 and the American Institute of Architects Award in 1986. She was elected into the National Academy of Design in 1990 and became a full member in 1994.

Bartlett's work is in the collections of the Metropolitan Museum of Art (New York), the Museum of Modern Art (New York), the Guggenheim Museum (New York), the Whitney Museum of American Art (New York), the National Gallery of Art (Washington, D.C.), the Tate Gallery (London), and other institutions.

Her image is included in the iconic 1972 poster Some Living American Women Artists by Mary Beth Edelson.

References

Further reading
 Bartlett, Jennifer. In the Garden. Abrams, 1982. (With John Russell)
 Bartlett, Jennifer. History of the Universe: A Novel. Nimbus Books, 1985.
 Bartlett, Jennifer. "A Peaceable Kingdom." In Cuoco, Lorin, ed. The Dual Muse: The Writer as Artist, the Artist as Writer. John Benjamins Publishing, 1999, pp. 49–68.
 Eisenberg, Deborah. Air: 24 Hours: Jennifer Bartlett. New York: Abrams, 1994.
 Goldwater, Marge, Jennifer Bartlett. New York: Abbeville Press, 1985.
 Katz, Vincent. "Bartlett Shows Her Colors." Art in America, January 2007, 106–111.
 Ottmann, Klaus, and Terrie Sultan. Jennifer Bartlett: History of the Universe — Works 1970–2011. Parrish Art Museum, 2013.
 Richardson, Brenda. Jennifer Bartlett: Early Plate Work. Andover, Massachusetts: Addison Gallery of American Art, 2006.
 Scott, Sue A. Jennifer Bartlett: A Print Retrospective. Orlando, Florida: Orlando Museum of Art, 1993.
 Van der Marck, Jan. Reconnecting: Recent Work by Jennifer Bartlett. Detroit, Michigan: Founders Society, Detroit Institute of Arts, 1987.
 Smith, Roberta. Rhapsody. Abrams, 1985.
Locks Gallery Publications

External links
Jennifer Bartlett at Marianne Boesky Gallery
Jennifer Bartlett at Locks Gallery
Jennifer Bartlett works at the Metropolitan Museum, New York
At Sea Japan (1980) at the Tate Museum
Surface Substitution on 36 Plates (1972) at the Tate Museum
Archives of American Art, Smithsonian Institution: Oral history interview
 

1941 births
2022 deaths
20th-century American painters
20th-century American printmakers
20th-century American women artists
21st-century American painters
21st-century American women artists
American women painters
American women printmakers
Deaths from cancer in New York (state)
Deaths from acute myeloid leukemia
Members of the American Academy of Arts and Letters
Mills College alumni
Neo-expressionist artists
Painters from California
People from Amagansett, New York
People from Long Beach, California
School of Visual Arts faculty
Yale School of Art alumni